Viper was a steel roller coaster located at Six Flags Great Adventure in Jackson Township, New Jersey. Manufactured by TOGO at an estimated cost of $4 million, the ride opened to the public in June 1995. It replaced another steel coaster manufactured by TOGO, Ultra Twister, which was removed in 1989. It featured two inversions, including a heartline roll and a unique dive loop element developed specifically for this ride. Following years of maintenance issues, extensive downtime, and low ridership due to roughness, Viper was permanently closed after the 2004 season and demolished the following year. A record-breaking wooden coaster called El Toro opened in its place in 2006.

History
Following Time Warner's purchase of Six Flags in 1992, the decision was made to enhance theming within the amusement park. A new section called Frontier Adventures was among the changes, which combined the "Best of the West" and "Hernando's Hideaway" areas. Prior to the change, this section of the park previously housed Ultra Twister, the first pipeline roller coaster to open in the United States, which was removed in 1989 and relocated to Six Flags AstroWorld. Ultra Twister's manufacturer, TOGO, took the extraordinary step of building a full-scale prototype of a new coaster model and premiering it at their testing facility in Ohio. The prototype model introduced a new element that TOGO called the "dive loop", which contained a unique inline twist maneuver at the top of a vertical loop. Six Flags Great Adventure bought into the concept and hired TOGO to build one in the former location of Ultra Twister.

Time Warner originally wanted the new ride to be based on the 1992 Clint Eastwood film Unforgiven, but the theme didn't perform well during market research. Six Flags ultimately chose the name Viper to pair its snake-like branding with the western-themed Frontiers Adventures. During construction, which began near the end of the 1994 season, officials asked TOGO to install additional steel rings on the lift hill and first drop to enhance its snake-like appearance. Throughout the queue, aged western props and other western-themed elements were added to give it a ghost town appearance. A steel structure left behind from the removal of Ultra Twister was covered with a rustic wood frame and placed near Viper's entrance.

Viper opened to the public on June 2, 1995, and cost an estimated $4 million to construct. Despite a warm reception, it was plagued with maintenance issues and extensive downtime over the years. Coupled with ride quality issues and gaining a reputation for being extremely rough, guest satisfaction quickly declined. The hourly capacity of the ride also suffered from its confusing boarding and unloading procedure, where guests entered and exited on the same side inside the station. In addition, the combination over-the-shoulder and lap restraint system also proved to be cumbersome, resulting in slow loading times.

In 1998, Viper was closed for most of the season, as Six Flags was having difficulty procuring replacement parts needed for maintenance. Behind the scenes, TOGO was struggling financially from the fallout of the company's highly-unsuccessful Windjammer Surf Racers, which opened at Knott's Berry Farm in 1997. The overall track design was also a factor in many of the ride's issues, with joints along the track unable to properly handle the stress from the trains. Sections of track were rewelded often and sometimes replaced altogether.

Following sporadic operation over several years, Viper did not open with the park in 2001 and remained closed indefinitely for the rest of the year. It was subsequently removed from the park's promotional materials and maps. TOGO filed for Chapter 7 bankruptcy that same year and shuttered their American offices. Six Flags considered removing Viper altogether and replacing it with an attraction from another park, but they were unsuccessful finding one that would properly fit its footprint. They pushed forward with modifications to the trains and track, and the coaster reopened to the public on March 29, 2002. The modifications failed to resolve ongoing issues, however, and Viper was down to one operating train by 2004. That season would prove to be its last, and the roller coaster was demolished in June 2005. They kept the station intact and repurposed it for El Toro, a record-breaking and well-received wooden coaster that opened in 2006.

Ride experience

Queue
Guests passed underneath the entrance sign and entered a western-themed desert. This area featured many props, such as a well, cacti, wagons and more. Along the way, guests walked past a village with shade. Between 1997 and 1998, the site was home to a comedy show called The Legend of Venom Gulch, which would entertain guests while waiting in line. This show utilized the set pieces of the ghost town as backdrop and props for the show with a set of steps from the second floor, where actors could enter and exit the stage area. Guests then approached the station, which resembled an abandoned Spanish church complete with buttressed walls, arched windows and a bell tower. It featured state-of-the-art technology with a special elevator adjacent to the entrance stairs, making the ride handicapped accessible. The placement of the elevator meant guests with disabilities could then wait on the regular queue line. The train shed featured the exact same exterior as the station. Once guests climbed a set of stairs, they entered the station and boarded the ride.

In 1999, a portion of the original queue line was taken over by Rodeo Stampede, a Breakdance ride by German manufacturer HUSS. The area was no longer needed as the popularity of Viper had significantly plunged.

Layout
As the train departed the station, it made a left turn and headed up the  lift hill. At the top, the train made a left turn, followed by the first drop. This is followed by a left turn and a heartline roll inversion. The train then made a left turn into the final brake run before returning to the station.

References

Six Flags Great Adventure
Roller coasters operated by Six Flags
Former roller coasters in New Jersey